is a passenger railway station located in the city of Chōfu, Tokyo, Japan, operated by the private railway operator Keio Corporation.

Lines 
Fuda Station is served by the Keio Line, and is located 14.9 kilometers from the starting point of the line at Shinjuku Station.

Station layout 
This station consists of one underground island platform serving two tracks,  with the station building located above The underground tracks opened on August 19, 2012 replacing the ground-level tracks. The platform is equipped with automatic platform screen doors.

Platforms

History
The station opened in 1917, and was relocated to its present location in 1927. It was rebuilt as an underground station in 2012.

Passenger statistics
In fiscal 2019, the station was used by an average of 16,784 passengers daily. 

The passenger figures (boarding passengers only) for previous years are as shown below.

Surrounding area
 Kokuryō Shrine
Tamagawa Hospital

See also
 List of railway stations in Japan

References

External links

Keio Railway Station Information 

Keio Line
Stations of Keio Corporation
Railway stations in Tokyo
Chōfu, Tokyo
Railway stations in Japan opened in 1917